Gaëtan Weissbeck (born 17 January 1997) is a French professional footballer who plays as a midfielder and captains Sochaux.

Club career
On 31 January 2019, Weissbeck signed his first professional contract with Sochaux for three years. He made his professional debut for Sochaux in a 0–0 Ligue 2 tie with SM Caen on 26 July 2019.

References

External links
 
 
 RacingStub Profile

1997 births
Living people
People from Wissembourg
French footballers
Association football midfielders
FC Sochaux-Montbéliard players
Ligue 2 players
Championnat National 2 players
Championnat National 3 players
Footballers from Alsace
Sportspeople from Bas-Rhin
RC Strasbourg Alsace players
FCSR Haguenau players
French people of German descent